Hunshelf is a civil parish in the Metropolitan Borough of Barnsley.  At the 2001 census it had a population of 324, reducing to 246 at the 2011 Census.  Most of its population lives in the village of Green Moor.

See also
Listed buildings in Hunshelf

References

The town-fields and commons of Hunshelf, Langsett & Waldershelf and how such were alienated from communal to private ownership, Joseph Kenworthy, 1917. Volume 13 of Early history of Stocksbridge and district: Handbook.
History in Hunshelf, chapter in Aspects of Barnsley, Brian Elliot, Wharncliffe Publishing.

External links

Civil parishes in South Yorkshire
Geography of the Metropolitan Borough of Barnsley